HACC, Central Pennsylvania's Community College, (HACC) is a community college in Harrisburg, Pennsylvania. HACC is accredited by the Commission on Higher Education of the Middle States Association of Colleges and Schools. HACC serves 17,000 degree-seeking students, as well as more than 8,300 remedial and workforce development students. The College has more than 100,000 alumni.

History
HACC, Central Pennsylvania's Community College, became the first community college in Pennsylvania on Feb. 14, 1964. HACC is the largest community college in Pennsylvania and serves students at its Gettysburg, Harrisburg,  Lancaster, Lebanon and York campuses.

Campuses

HACC's Gettysburg Campus
HACC's Gettysburg Campus is located at 731 Old Harrisburg Road Gettysburg, PA 17325.

HACC's Harrisburg Campus
HACC's Harrisburg Campus is located at One HACC Drive Harrisburg, PA 17110 (down the road from the Pennsylvania Farm Show Complex & Expo Center). The campus includes the Bruce E. Cooper Student Center, the Rose Lehrman Arts Center, and Midtown Trade and Technology Center ("Midtown Campus").

HACC's Lancaster Campus
HACC's Lancaster Campus is located at 1641 Old Philadelphia Pike Lancaster, PA 17602.

HACC's Lebanon Campus
HACC's Lebanon Campus is located at 735 Cumberland Street, Lebanon PA 17042.

HACC's York Campus
HACC's York Campus is located at 2010 Pennsylvania Ave York, PA 17404.

Activities
HACC students compete within the Eastern Pennsylvania Collegiate Conference (EPCC) in Region XIX of the National Junior College Athletic Association (NJCAA). The intercollegiate sports are offered at HACC's Harrisburg Campus and are open to all HACC students.

There are multiple student organizations and clubs at each of campus, including Student Government Associations (SGA), honors fraternities, major-related clubs and multicultural clubs.

Name 
In 2005, Harrisburg Area Community College adopted the name HACC, Central Pennsylvania's Community College.  While Harrisburg Area Community College remains the College's full legal name, the College registered the legal alias "HACC, Central Pennsylvania's Community College", in 2007 and began using that name almost exclusively.

Notable alumni

 Timothy DeFoor, Auditor General of Pennsylvania
 Daniel C. Miller, Harrisburg City Controller
 Joy Ufema, first Thanatology Nurse in U.S.
 Wanda Williams, Harrisburg politician

References

External links
 
HACC Athletics and Recreation

Two-year colleges in the United States
Community colleges in Pennsylvania
Universities and colleges in Harrisburg, Pennsylvania
Lebanon, Pennsylvania
Educational institutions established in 1964
Education in Harrisburg, Pennsylvania
Universities and colleges in Lancaster, Pennsylvania
York, Pennsylvania
Universities and colleges in York County, Pennsylvania
Universities and colleges in Lebanon County, Pennsylvania
Universities and colleges in Adams County, Pennsylvania
Gettysburg, Pennsylvania
1964 establishments in Pennsylvania